Gomole is a district of Borena Zone in Oromia Region of Ethiopia.

References 

Districts of Oromia Region